The 1931 Woolwich East by-election was held on 15 April 1931.  The by-election was held due to the elevation to the peerage of the incumbent Labour MP, Henry Snell.  It was won by the Labour candidate George Hicks.

References

Woolwich East by-election
Woolwich East by-election
Woolwich East by-election
Woolwich East,1931
Woolwich East,1931
Woolwich